Hatton (occasionally Hatton of Cruden) is a village in Aberdeenshire, Scotland that lies on the A90 road, approximately equidistant from both Ellon and Peterhead.

It has a biscuit factory that was once called Simmers - it was Hatton's only claim to fame, as it supplied biscuits to such upmarket shops as Marks and Spencers. However, it was purchased by McVities and then acquired by Murdoch Allan and Sons. It also has a shop, a village hall, a primary school and small park.

History
There is considerable evidence of early human habitation in the vicinity, most notably by the existence of the ancient Catto Long Barrow and numerous tumuli nearby.

Transport

Hatton railway station, on the Boddam Branch, served the village from 1897 to 1932.

It has a single grass runway (headings 08/26). It is believed to only be used by the farmer on whose land it sits. The airport is in the Scottish Centre (EGPX0840) area control centre.

Footnotes

Villages in Aberdeenshire
Tumuli in Scotland